Stanislav Tymofeyenko (born 3 June 1989) is a Ukrainian basketball player for BC Dnipro and the Ukrainian national team, where he participated at the EuroBasket 2015. He is bronze medalist of the 2017 FIBA 3x3 Europe Cup.

References

1989 births
Living people
Ukrainian men's basketball players
Ukrainian men's 3x3 basketball players
Power forwards (basketball)
Sportspeople from Dnipro
BC Dnipro players
BC Pieno žvaigždės players